Guo Musical Instrument Company (GMIC) is a Taiwan-based musical instrument manufacturer, specializing in flutes, piccolos, flute head joints, and saxophone necks and head joints.  Founded by Geoffrey Guo in 1988, GMIC offers its products for sale online and through various retailers all over the world.  Some of its instruments include a tenor flute, a G soprano flute, grenaditte flutes, and a new C flute design called a Tocco flute.  Many of these models of flutes and piccolos come in many different colors.

In 2004, Geoffrey Guo and flute professor Mark Dannenbring developed the grenaditte flute.  This lightweight, plastic flute enabled Dannenbring, who suffered from focal dystonia, to return to the concert setting.  GMIC also claims that the grenaditte flute is impervious to weather, environmentally friendly, and easy to maintain.  The grenaditte flute is also ideal for those who experience shoulder pains or RSI with a metal flute.

In 2009 GMIC introduced the New Voice flute, which is smaller and lighter than the grenaditte flute, and offered in a wide array of colors, as opposed to the grenaditte's black/gray color.

In 2012 they released the Tocco flute, which has received a reddot Award 2014 Honourable Mention for New Design.

Models 
AME Standard Flute 
FiFe+
Grenaditte Flute
Grenaditte G Flute
Grenaditte Tenor Flute
Grenaditte Alto Flute
New Voice Alto Flute
New Voice D’Amore Flute
Grenaditte Alto Flute
Grenaditte D’Amore Flute
Grenaditte Piccolo Flute
New Voice G Flute
New Voice Piccolo Flute
New Voice Tenor Flute
New Voice Flute
Tocco Flute
Tocco Plus Flute

Head Joints and Accessories 
Dynalance Head Joint
Executor Head Joint
New Voice Head Joint
Grenaditte Head Joint
Saxophone Neck
Saxophone End-Plug

References

External links
 http://www.gflute.com/ - Guo Musical Instrument Company Homepage
https://www.youtube.com/watch?v=t15iLh3xnoU - Introduce the Grenaditte Flute by Mark Dannenbring

1988 establishments in Taiwan
Companies established in 1988
Flute makers
Musical instrument manufacturing companies of Taiwan
Taiwanese brands